Camballin is a small town in the West Kimberley district of Western Australia. The town was established in the 1950s by the Public Works Department of Western Australia to service the Camballin Irrigation Scheme.

At the 2016 census, Camballin had a population of 729.

History
The town was established by the Public Works Department of Western Australia to service the Camballin Irrigation Scheme, which has since become defunct due to flooding. It was initially established to support Northern Developments Pty. Ltd, a company incorporated in Sydney in 1951 to establish small scale rice production in 1952. Demonstration that rice production was feasible, a  dam was constructed on the Uralla Creek in 1957, trebling the water storage. The name of the town was chosen by Northern Development Ltd in 1957, with the townsite being constructed to service the Liveringa Rice Project. The town was named after one of the nearby stations.

The town's growth continued with the Australian Land & Cattle Company Limited purchasing Camballin station, Liveringa station and a further five stations in the Kimberley region. This influx of private investment created strong labour demand for the next two decades, with the project leaving a lasting legacy to this day.

Geography

The town lies to the east of Grant Range, and south of Erskine range.

Description

The town now houses school teachers and other personnel who work at the nearby Looma Community. Amenities in the town are: caravan park, shopping (no fuel), reticulated water and power, phones (including pay phone booth) and mechanical repairs. The town is also serviced by a landfill site nearby, mobile satellite phone coverage and contains a rundown picture gardens. The power station provides power to the nearby communities of Looma and New Looma.

References

External links

Camballin townsite map

Towns in Western Australia
Kimberley (Western Australia)